Venise-en-Québec is a municipality in the province of Quebec, Canada, located at the north end of Lake Champlain in the Regional County Municipality of Le Haut-Richelieu. The population as of the Canada 2021 Census was 1,899.

Demographics

Population

Language

See also
List of municipalities in Quebec

References

External links

Venise-en-Québec official website

Municipalities in Quebec
Incorporated places in Le Haut-Richelieu Regional County Municipality